The Macedonian-Adrianopolitan Volunteer Corps (Makedono-odrinsko opalchenie) was a volunteer corps of the Bulgarian Army during the Balkan Wars. It was formed on 23 September 1912 and consisted of Bulgarian volunteers from Macedonia and Thrace, regions still under Ottoman rule, and thus not subject to Bulgarian military service. 

The Commander of the Corps was Major General Nikola Genev, Assistant Commander - Colonel Aleksandar Protogerov. Chief of Staff was Major Petar Darvingov. During the Second Balkan War Macedonian-Adrianopolitan Volunteer Corps took part in the battles against Serbian Army. Besides Bulgarians, the corps also included volunteers from other nationalities, including several units made up of Armenians: the 2nd Company, led by Lieutenant Garegin Nzhdeh and Andranik Ozanian (in the 12th Lozengrad Battalion or druzhina). There were many Armenians in the 3rd Company led by Lieutenant Torgom (of the same 12th Battalion of the 3rd Brigade). Another Armenian officer, Hovhannes Chaush, led a company in the 7th battalion of 3rd Brigade.

The Macedonian-Adrianopolitan Volunteer Corps (23 Sep 1912 - 1 Oct 1913) 
Total personnel numbered 14,670. Bulgarians were 14,139 (11,470 were from Macedonia, 1,215 - from Thrace, and 2,512 - from Bulgaria). Foreigners were 656 (more than 400 Armenians, of which only 275 in the 2nd Armenian company, 82 Russians, 68 Romanians, 40 Serbs, 21 Austro-Hungarians, 12 Montenegrins, 3 Greeks, 1 Albanian, 1 Englishman, 1 Italian, and a Persian).

Honours
Opalchenie Peak in Vinson Massif, Antarctica is named after the Bulgarian Volunteer Force in the 1877-1878 Russo-Turkish War and the Macedonian-Adrianople Volunteer Force in the 1912-1913 Balkan Wars.

Notes

Sources 
 Darvingov, Petar. History of the Macedonian-Adrianopolitan Volunteer Corp (Volume 1, 1919, Volume 2, 1925) (Bulgarian)
 Македоно-одринското опълчение 1912-1913. Личен състав по документи на Дирекция "Централен военен архив", София 2006 (Macedonian-Adrianopolitan Volunteer Corps. Staff according to documents from Directorate Central Military Archives, Sofia 2006)

Military history of Bulgaria
Macedonia under the Ottoman Empire
Ottoman Thrace
Kosovo vilayet
Manastir vilayet
Salonica vilayet
Adrianople vilayet
Military units and formations of the Balkan Wars
Military units and formations of Bulgaria
History of Macedonia (region)
Military units and formations established in 1912
1912 establishments in Bulgaria
Internal Macedonian Revolutionary Organization